Yapu Qullu (Aymara yapu field, qullu mountain, "field mountain", also spelled Yapu Kkollu) is a  mountain in the Andes of Bolivia. It is located in the Oruro Department, Mejillones Province, Carangas Municipality, northwest of Carangas.

References 

Mountains of Oruro Department